Donald Douglas Alsop (born August 28, 1927) is a Senior United States district judge of the United States District Court for the District of Minnesota.

Education and career

Alsop was born in Duluth, Minnesota, and served in the United States Army from 1945 to 1946. He received his Bachelor of Science in Law degree from the University of Minnesota in 1950 and his Bachelor of Laws from the University of Minnesota Law School in 1952. Following graduation, he clerked for Justice Thomas F. Gallagher of the Minnesota Supreme Court. He spent two years in private practice in Saint Paul, Minnesota, and then moved to New Ulm, Minnesota, where he practiced from 1954 to 1974.

Federal judicial service

On August 8, 1974, the day he announced his resignation, President Richard Nixon nominated Alsop for a seat on the United States District Court for the District of Minnesota vacated by Judge Philip Neville, who was assuming senior status. Alsop was confirmed by the United States Senate on December 18, 1974, and received his commission on December 20, 1974, from President Gerald Ford. He served as Chief Judge from 1985 to 1992, assuming senior status on August 28, 1992.

See also
 List of United States federal judges by longevity of service

References

Sources
 

1927 births
Living people
Judges of the United States District Court for the District of Minnesota
United States district court judges appointed by Gerald Ford
20th-century American judges
People from Duluth, Minnesota
University of Minnesota Law School alumni
21st-century American judges